Salisbury is a small coastal beach town and summer tourist destination in Essex County, Massachusetts, United States. The community is a popular summer resort beach town situated on the Atlantic Ocean, north of Boston on the New Hampshire border. It is home to the new Salisbury Beach Boardwalk, full of souvenir shops, restaurants, cafes, arcades and panoramic views of the Atlantic Ocean. The population was 9,236 at the 2020 census. Parts of town comprise the census-designated place of Salisbury.

History

This was once territory of the Pentucket tribe of Pennacook Indians. It was settled by the English in 1638 as Colchester, and incorporated in 1640 as Salisbury, after Salisbury in Wiltshire, England. 
The original roads at the center of the town formed a compact semicircle, which allowed the residents to quickly reach the garrison house in case of attack. Those roads still exist, though the shape today is triangular, being bounded by Elm Street, School Street and Bridge Road. One of the two greatest fears at the time was the Naumkeag tribe of Indians, thus the men of the town took turns standing watch against a surprise attack, especially at night. The Naumkeags, however, had been decimated by plague, and the threat was not what it once might have been. The second threat came from wolves, which were plentiful, and which killed the livestock and dug in the graveyard.

The original residents, including Richard Currier, were given one small house lot near the center of town, and one larger planting lot just outside the center for farming. Families also owned large sections of "sweepage lots" near the beach, where apparently they harvested the salt marsh hay. At the time, the area was almost entirely unbroken virgin forest, which had to be cleared for the construction of houses and the planting of fields.

Richard Currier was a millwright and was one of the original settlers of Salisbury. He is listed in the first division of house lots in 1640 and received additional land in 1641 and 1642. In 1654 there were sixty commoners in Salisbury and they voted that thirty families were to be chosen to move west of the Powow River. Eighteen of these families were commoners and the number of commoners were increased to 26 by the time Salisbury New Town became the town of Amesbury in 1668. Richard heads the list of the eighteen commoners and was one of the signers to the Articles of Agreement between the inhabitants of the Old Town and those of the New Town, 1 May 1654.

In 1866, Beach Road was constructed across Great Marsh, providing access to the town's five miles of pristine beach. It developed into a thriving summer resort, lined with hotels, restaurants, shops, cottages, arcades and amusement parks. A carousel called The Flying Horses, hand carved by Charles I. D. Looff, was installed in 1914. John Miller built The Sky Rocket, the beach's first roller coaster. A Dodgem ride, originally built by Max and Harold Stoeher of Methuen, operated at Salisbury Beach in one form or another from 1920 to 1980. Major entertainers provided concerts, including Glenn Miller, Ella Fitzgerald, Louis Armstrong, Frank Sinatra and Liberace.

The resort remained vibrant through the 1960s, then gradually faded. WildCat, the last roller coaster, was razed in 1976. Pirate's Fun Park, the last small amusement park, closed in 2004 to be replaced with condominiums.

Geography
According to the United States Census Bureau, the town has a total area of 17.9 square miles (46.2 km2), of which 15.4 square miles (40.0 km2) is land and 2.4 square miles (6.2 km2; 13.50%) is water. Salisbury is the northernmost town in Massachusetts, with its northwest corner (where Elmwood Street meets the New Hampshire border) being at approximately 42°53'12.26". Lying along the northern banks of the Merrimack River at its mouth, the town is bordered by the Atlantic Ocean to the east, the Merrimack River and Newburyport to the south, Amesbury to the west, and Seabrook, New Hampshire, to the north. The town is home to Salisbury Beach State Reservation, a park which includes the entire seacoast and a small portion inland, as well as the Ram Island and Carr Island State Wildlife Management Areas, the two islands lying in the middle of the Merrimack (along with Eagle Island, which is not protected). Much of the town is covered by marshes, especially in the eastern part of town.  Several brooks and creeks run through town as well. The town contains three villages, Salisbury Beach, Salisbury Plains (in the northwest corner of town) and Browns Point (between Salisbury Beach and the center of town).

Education

Salisbury has one public school, Salisbury Elementary School. Middle school students attend Triton Regional Middle School, and high school students attend Triton Regional High School, along with Newbury, and Rowley.

Transportation
The town lies along the northern end of U.S. Route 1 in Massachusetts. It enters the town via the Newburyport Turnpike Bridge and heads in a roughly "S"-shaped route through the center of town to the New Hampshire border. Prior to the erection of the bridge, the road south of the town center was east of its current location, leading along Ferry Road to a ferry landing, which connected the town to Newburyport. The town also constitutes the northern termini of Interstate 95 in Massachusetts, and of Interstate 495, which lies just one-quarter mile into the town at I-95 Exit 59. Exit 60 gives access to both Route 1 and Massachusetts/New Hampshire Route 286, which provides access to the beaches. The eastern terminus of Massachusetts Route 110 is in Salisbury (at Route 1), and accesses I-95 at Exit 58, just over the Amesbury town line. The northernmost segment of Massachusetts Route 1A passes through town, entering concurrently with Route 1 before heading east from the town center and turning north along Salisbury Beach to join New Hampshire Route 1A.

The Merrimack Valley Regional Transit Authority provides local bus service connecting Salisbury to nearby communities. The nearest train station is in Newburyport.

Demographics

As of the census of 2000, there were 7,827 people, 3,082 households, and 1,990 families residing in the town. There were 4,156 housing units at an average density of 104.0 persons/km2 (269.3 persons/sq mi). The racial makeup of the town was 97.55% White, 0.41% African American, 0.31% Native American, 0.34% Asian, 0.09% Pacific Islander, 0.26% from other races, 1.05% from two or more races, and 1.18% was Hispanic or Latino of any race.

There were 3,082 households, out of which 29.5% had children under the age of 18 living with them, 49.2% were married couples living together, 10.9% have a woman whose husband does not live with her, and 35.4% were non-families. 26.6% of all households were made up of individuals, and 9.3% had someone living alone who was 65 years of age or older.  The average household size was 2.53 and the average family size was 3.10.

In the town, the age distribution of the population shows 23.6% under the age of 18, 6.4% from 18 to 24, 32.1% from 25 to 44, 26.1% from 45 to 64, and 11.9% who were 65 years of age or older.  The median age was 39 years. For every 100 females, there were 97.5 males.  For every 100 females age 18 and over, there were 95.5 males.

The median income for a household in the town was $49,310, and the median income for a family was $56,327. Males had a median income of $41,705 versus $31,250 for females. The per capita income for the town was $21,608.  6.8% of the population and 4.5% of families were below the poverty line.  Out of the total people living in poverty, 9.6% are under the age of 18 and 5.6% are 65 or older.

Government
Salisbury is part of the Massachusetts Senate's 1st Essex district.

Points of interest
 Salisbury Beach Boardwalk
 Allen Rock  
 Ann's Diner
 Badgers Rock
 Blue Ocean Music Hall
 Joe's Playland
 Rings Island
 Salisbury Beach State Reservation
 Hideaway Pub

Photos

Notable people
 John Clough, a founder of the town, sailed on ship Elizabeth from England in 1635
Bob Corkum, ice hockey center
 Caleb Cushing, congressman  
 Hannah Webster Foster, novelist 
 Horatio Balch Hackett, Biblical scholar 
 Josiah S. Johnston, congressman and senator 
 Susannah Martin, witch trial victim
 Amos Morrill, judge 
 James Pike, congressman 
 Redford Webster, apothecary, politician and antiquarian 
 John Wheelwright, clergyman

See also

 North Shore (Massachusetts)
 Open town meeting
 Salisbury Beach Military Reservation

References

External links

 Town of Salisbury official website
 Salisbury Public Library
 Salisbury Council on Aging News and Info Portal

 
1638 establishments in Massachusetts
Populated coastal places in Massachusetts
Populated places established in 1638
Massachusetts populated places on the Merrimack River